The following is a list of clubs who have played in the English Football League Two at any time since its formation in 2004 to the current season. EFL League Two teams playing in the 2022–23 season are indicated in bold. If the longest spell is the current spell, this is indicated in bold, and if the highest finish is that of the most recent season, this is also in bold. A total of 70 teams have played in League Two. Clubs in italic no longer exist as the legal entities they competed as in League Two.

All statistics here refer to time in EFL League Two only, with the exception of 'Most recent finish' which refers to all levels of play, and 'Last promotion' which refers to the club's last promotion from the fifth tier of English football.

Overview of clubs by season 

Clubs
EFL League Two clubs